The Albatros D.XII was a German single-seat fighter biplane first flown in March 1918. It was the last of the Albatros fighters completed and flown before the end of World War I and had the same slab-sided fuselage seen on the Albatros D.X.

Design and development
The first example of the D.XII used a 134 kW (180 hp) Mercedes D.IIIa engine and had balanced, parallel-chord ailerons. The second, built in April 1918, featured unbalanced, inversely tapered ailerons and Bohme undercarriage with pneumatic shock absorbers. Although it was initially fitted with the Mercedes engine, it was later re-engined with a BMW IIIa producing 138 kW (185 hp). In this form, the D.XII competed in the third Adlershof D-Type Contest in October 1918. No further aircraft were built.

Specifications (D.XII)

Notes

References

1910s German fighter aircraft
Biplanes
Single-engined tractor aircraft
D.12
Aircraft first flown in 1918